August Wöginger (born 2 November 1974) is an Austrian politician currently serving as parliamentary leader of the Austrian People's Party and .

References 

Living people
1974 births
Austrian People's Party politicians
Members of the National Council (Austria)
21st-century Austrian politicians